Inta or INTA may refer to:

Abbreviations
European Parliament Committee on International Trade, a European Parliament committee
Instituto Nacional de Técnica Aeroespacial, Spanish space agency
National Agricultural Technology Institute (Instituto Nacional de Tecnología Agropecuaria), an institute in Argentina
International New Thought Alliance, an umbrella organization of New Thought organizations
International Trademark Association, a worldwide not-for-profit association

Places
Inta, a town in the Komi Republic, Russia
Inta Urban Okrug, a municipal formation which the town of republic significance of Inta in the Komi Republic, Russia is incorporated as
Inta Airport, an airport in the Komi Republic, Russia

Other
Inta (given name), feminine Latvian first name
INTA-255 and INTA-300, Spanish sounding rockets
Inta Juice, a juice and smoothie franchise financially backed by Randy Moss, American football player
N-2′-Indolylnaltrexamine, an experimental opioid drug